Gérard Aygoui (5 October 1936 – 12 March 2021) was a French footballer who played as a forward.

Biography
Aygoui began his career with Montpellier HSC before joining Olympique de Marseille in 1957. He played 21 games in Division 1 for the team, scoring 2 goals, as well as 52 games in Division 2 with 21 goals. He scored 13 goals in the 1960–61 season, including a hat trick against US Boulogne. In 1962, he played a Europa League match for Marseille against the Belgian club Royale Union Saint-Gilloise in which he scored one goal in a loss. He was selected to play for France in the 1960 Summer Olympics, but did not appear in a match.

Gérard Aygoui died in Montpellier on 12 March 2021 at the age of 84.

References

1936 births
2021 deaths
Footballers from Montpellier
French footballers
Association football forwards
Ligue 1 players
Ligue 2 players
Montpellier HSC players
Olympique de Marseille players
Nîmes Olympique players